Alice ("Alie") te Riet (born August 4, 1953 in Groningen) is a former breaststroke swimmer from the Netherlands, who competed for her native country at the 1972 Summer Olympics in Munich, West Germany. There she was eliminated in the qualifying heats of the 100 m breaststroke, clocking 1:18.79 (20th place), and the same in the 200 m breaststroke: 2:48.49 (17th place). As a member of the Dutch relay team, Te Riet finished in fifth place in the 4x100 m medley relay (4:29.99), alongside Enith Brigitha (backstroke), Anke Rijnders (butterfly) and Hansje Bunschoten (freestyle).

References

1953 births
Living people
Olympic swimmers of the Netherlands
Swimmers at the 1972 Summer Olympics
Sportspeople from Groningen (city)
Dutch female breaststroke swimmers